Gay-Yee Westerhoff (born 14 June 1973, in Hull, East Riding of Yorkshire, England), is an English cellist of the all female string quartet, Bond.

She studied A-level music at Wyke College in Hull and holds an Honours Degree in music from Trinity College of Music in London. Westerhoff has performed with groups and musicians including Primal Scream, Spice Girls, Talvin Singh, Embrace, Sting, Bryan Adams, Barry Manilow and Vanessa-Mae.

On 3 January 2012 Westerhoff and her boyfriend of several years Russell Sapp welcomed the birth of a baby boy, Ulysses.

References

External links 
 Bond - Official Website
 Symmetry and Sound - Picture site
 

English classical cellists
Musicians from Kingston upon Hull
1973 births
Living people
English people of Chinese descent
Bond (band) members